Doris januarii is a species of sea slug, a dorid nudibranch, a marine gastropod mollusk in the family Dorididae.

Taxonomic history
This species was described by Rudolph Bergh in 1878 but considered to be a synonym of Doris verrucosa by von Ihering, 1886 and subsequent authors. A detailed anatomical comparison of these species concluded that they were distinct species.

Distribution
This species occurs on the Atlantic Ocean coast of Brazil, from Pernambuco to São Paulo.

Ecology
This species lives at depths up to 12 m in the rocky subtidal region, near areas covered by the encrusting sponge Hymeniacidon heliophila (Parker, 1910) during the reproductive season.

References

Dorididae
Gastropods described in 1878